The People's Vanguard Party, or Popular Vanguard Party is a communist party in Costa Rica. PVP was founded in 1931 as the Workers and Farmers Party, but was soon renamed to the Communist Party of Costa Rica (Partido Comunista de Costa Rica).

From 1931 to 1947, the party published Trabajo as a communist newspaper. The PVP's current publication is El Popular.

History
In 1943 the party was renamed as PVP, in order to facilitate its alliance with the Catholic Church and the government, whose reformist policies the party supported.

In 1949 the party was banned. Its militants began working under the name 'Partido Acción Socialista Obrera'.

In the mid-1960s the U.S. State Department estimated the party membership to be approximately 300.

In 1970, the party again could contest elections.

In 1984, a severe internal crisis appeared in the party. At the 14th party congress, two of the party MPs, Arnoldo Ferreto Segura and Humberto Vargas Carbonell took over the party leadership and deposed Mora (who had led the party since 1934). Mora's followers continued to use the name PVP, thus there were two parties with the same name. In 1984 Mora's party took the name Costa Rican People's Party.

Electoral performance

Presidential

See also
 :Category:People's Vanguard Party (Costa Rica) politicians
 Manuel Mora
 Joaquín Gutiérrez

References

External links
Official Website

1931 establishments in Costa Rica
Costa Rica
Communist parties in Costa Rica
Political parties established in 1931
Political parties in Costa Rica
Formerly banned communist parties

International Meeting of Communist and Workers Parties